Catalonian Folksongs is a solo album by pianist Tete Montoliu recorded in 1977 and released on the Dutch label, Timeless.

Reception

Scott Yanow of AllMusic states, "For this set of piano solos, Tete Montoliu (a native of Spain who, if he had played regularly in the U.S., would have been much more famous in the jazz world) plays lyrical versions of ten obscure songs, most of which were composed by the Spanish singer-guitarist Joan Manuel Serrat. The melodies are sometimes haunting, sometimes just sentimental, but Montoliu consistently brings out their beauty during his concise interpretations".

Track listing
All compositions by Joan Manuel Serrat except where noted.
 "Cigales al Ven" (Tete Montoliu) – 5:01
 "Cançó de Matinada" – 4:38
 "Manuel" – 5:19
 "Me Embaix Apeu" – 4:15
 "Una Guitarra" – 3:54
 "Ruco" (Lluís Millet) – 5:40
 "Quin Plan Teniu Señor" – 3:28
 "Sota un Cireré Flurit" – 4:15
 "La Amelia Esta Malalba" (Josep Maria Llongueres) – 3:25
 "Els Segadors" (Francesc Alió) – 1:03

Personnel
Tete Montoliu – piano

References

Tete Montoliu albums
1978 albums
Timeless Records albums
Solo piano jazz albums